Acrotrema arnottianum is a flowering plant belonging to the family Dilleniaceae. It is native to Kerala and Tamil Nadu.

Description
The species is a perennial herb with short stem and obovate leaves. Flowers are bisexual and have yellow petals. Fruits are follicules with glossy seeds.

References

Dilleniaceae
Plants described in 1840
Flora of Tamil Nadu
Flora of Kerala